This is a list of University Football Club players who made one or more appearance in the Victorian Football League. University competed in the VFL from 1908 until 1914.

Players are listed by the date of their VFL debut with the club. In cases of players debuting in the same game, they are listed alphabetically.

University Football Club players

1900s

1910s

References

University
   
University Football Club players